Khamis Digol N'Dozangue (born 28 September 1998) is a professional footballer who plays as a rightback for Aubagne. Born in France, he represents the Central African Republic national team.

Professional career
Digol made his professional debut with AJ Auxerre in a 0–0 Ligue 2 tie with US Orléans on 26 August 2016.

International career
Born in France, Digol is of Central African Republic and Algerian descent. He was called up to represent the Central African Republic for a set of friendlies in June 2021. He debuted with the Central African Republic in a friendly 5–0 loss to Rwanda on 8 June 2021.

References

External links
 
 
 ESTAC Profile

1998 births
Living people
Sportspeople from Melun
Association football fullbacks
Citizens of the Central African Republic through descent
Central African Republic footballers
Central African Republic international footballers
French footballers
Central African Republic people of Algerian descent
French sportspeople of Algerian descent
French sportspeople of Central African Republic descent
ES Troyes AC players
AJ Auxerre players
Ligue 2 players
Championnat National 2 players
Championnat National 3 players
Footballers from Seine-et-Marne